Pammene argyrana is a species of moth belonging to the family Tortricidae.

It is native to Europe.

The wingspan is 10–13 mm. The forewing has a white or brownish-white spot at the dorsal edge. The colour of the hindwings is characteristic: brownish white with sharply delineated brown areas in the posterior part and at the apex. Meyrick describes it - The forewings are fuscous, sometimes ochreous- tinged, irregularly marked with black, costa strigulated with black and white ; three streaks from costa and margins of ocellus leaden - metallic ; sharply angulated edge of basal patch and central fascia darker, separated by a somewhat pentagonal white dorsal blotch more or less strigulated with blackish ; a suffused blackish spot before apex. Hindwings fuscous, in male basally whitish, with terminal and broader dorsal blackish fascia, in female posteriorly darker fuscous. The larva is pinkish-white, sharply ringed with white ; spots red ; head brown ; plate of 2 whitish or grey, posterior edge blackish 

Like Pammene giganteana, this species has larvae that develop in galls made by Cynipidae on Quercus. The adults fly in April-May, mostly at night, they often rest in a bark crack during the day.

References

Grapholitini